Sri Medan（Jawi: سري ميدن; ）is a main town in Batu Pahat District, Johor, Malaysia. Long ago, it was a famous bauxite mine in Johore.

References

Towns in Johor
Batu Pahat District